The Xiushui River is a river in Jiangxi, China that runs  west to Poyang Lake. It was the site of the 1939 Battle of Xiushui River.

References

Rivers of Jiangxi